Bogdan Musiol (born 25 July 1957 in Świętochłowice, Silesia, Poland) is an East German-German bobsledder who competed from the late 1970s to the early 1990s.

The former shot putter started pushing bob sleighs in 1977 for pilot Horst Bernhard. Behind Horst Schönau he became world champion for the first time in 1978. He also pushed for Bernhard Germeshausen, Meinhard Nehmer, Bernhard Lehmann, Detlef Richter and finally Wolfgang Hoppe.

Competing in five Winter Olympic Games, he won seven medals with one gold (Four-man: 1980), five silvers (Two-man: 1984, 1988; Four-man: 1984, 1988, 1992), and one bronze (Two-man: 1980).

Musiol also won seven medals at the FIBT World Championships with three golds (Two-man: 1989, Four-man: 1978, 1991), two silvers (Four-man: 1982, 1987), and two bronzes (Two-man: 1990, Four-man: 1989).

From 1980 to 1988, the former NVA Hauptmann took part for East Germany, then after German reunification in 1990 for Germany at the Winter Olympics until 1994. At the end of his career he had won 31 medals at international competitions (Olympics, World and European championships – 7 golds, 16 silvers, and 8 bronzes) and was the most successful bob athlete until Wolfgang Hoppe scored 33.

Musiol competed for ASK Vorwärts Oberhof, later WSV Oberhof 05. He owns fitness studios in Zella-Mehlis and Oschatz. He was in charge for the material of the German Bob- und Schlittenverband für Deutschland until his dismissal in 2000.

References
 Bobsleigh two-man Olympic medalists 1932–56 and since 1964
 Bobsleigh four-man Olympic medalists for 1924, 1932–56, and since 1964
 Bobsleigh two-man world championship medalists since 1931
 Bobsleigh four-man world championship medalists since 1930

External links
 
 

1957 births
Living people
People from Świętochłowice
Sportspeople from Silesian Voivodeship
Polish emigrants to East Germany
German male shot putters
German male bobsledders
Bobsledders at the 1980 Winter Olympics
Bobsledders at the 1984 Winter Olympics
Bobsledders at the 1988 Winter Olympics
Bobsledders at the 1992 Winter Olympics
Bobsledders at the 1994 Winter Olympics
Olympic bobsledders of East Germany
Olympic gold medalists for East Germany
Olympic silver medalists for East Germany
Olympic bronze medalists for East Germany
Olympic medalists in bobsleigh
German people of Polish descent
National People's Army military athletes
Medalists at the 1984 Winter Olympics
Medalists at the 1980 Winter Olympics
Medalists at the 1988 Winter Olympics
Medalists at the 1992 Winter Olympics
Olympic silver medalists for Germany
Olympic bobsledders of Germany
Recipients of the Patriotic Order of Merit in silver
Recipients of the Silver Laurel Leaf